Seehausen is a town and a former municipality in the Börde district, in Saxony-Anhalt, Germany. It is situated on the river Aller, west of Magdeburg. Since 1 January 2010, it is part of the town Wanzleben-Börde.

Former municipalities in Saxony-Anhalt
Wanzleben-Börde